The Irish Orienteering Association (IOA) is the national  organisation  of orienteering for the Republic of Ireland. It is a full member of the International Orienteering Federation.

Awards
The association bestows three special awards a year:
Silva Trophy, for the development of orienteering
Mactire Trophy, for achievement in an orienteering competition
Silva Award, for administration of an orienteering event

References

External links
Homepage

International Orienteering Federation members
Orienteering